¡Corre! (English: "Run!") is a pop song written by Mexican duo Jesse & Joy. The song is included on their third studio album, ¿Con Quién Se Queda El Perro? (2011), and was released as the second single on October 4, 2011.

The song has become one of the most successful for the duo, reaching number one in several countries. It is the most successful single from ¿Con Quién Se Queda El Perro? to date, and it is recognized as one of Jesse & Joy's signature songs. The track won Song of the Year and Record of the Year at the 13th Annual Latin Grammy Awards. The song was later translated to English and released as "Run".

Track listing

Chart performance
The song debuted at No. 27 on the Latin Pop Songs chart, the week ending February 4, 2012. The following week it jumped to No. 21. The song broke the top 20 on its third week, reaching No. 18, and on its fourth week it reached No.13. On its fifth week, the song rose to No. 8, and in its ninth week on the chart, it jumped to No. 3, becoming the duo's first song to do so. On the week ending March 31, 2012, and after two weeks at No.5, the song jumped to No. 1, becoming the first single from the duo to reach the top. The song became a huge commercial hit in Mexico, reaching number-one position and staying there for fourteen weeks.

Charts

Other versions
Bachata featuring La Republika

Release history

See also
List of number-one songs of 2012 (Mexico)

References

2011 songs
2011 singles
2012 singles
Jesse & Joy songs
Songs written by Tommy Torres
Songs written by Joy Huerta
Songs written by Jesse Huerta
Monitor Latino Top General number-one singles
Latin Grammy Award for Record of the Year
Latin Grammy Award for Song of the Year
Pop ballads
Bachata songs